Tomás Agustín Casas (born 27 September 1996) is an Argentine professional footballer who plays as a goalkeeper for Circulo Deportivo.

Career
Casas spent the majority of his youth career with Santamarina, though he did also have a loan spell with Defensa y Justicia. He was an unused substitute ten times for Santamarina in 2016, making his professional debut on the tenth occasion after coming off the bench following Emiliano Olivero's red card in a draw away to Atlético Paraná on 16 April. He featured once more that season, with Santamarina ending the campaign thirteenth.

Career statistics
.

References

External links

1996 births
Living people
Argentine footballers
People from Tandil
Association football goalkeepers
Sportspeople from Buenos Aires Province
Primera Nacional players
Club y Biblioteca Ramón Santamarina footballers
Club Atlético Los Andes footballers